Wigston Fields F.C. was an English football club from Wigston Fields, Leicestershire.

History
The club competed in the Leicestershire Senior League from 1957 to 1991, and the Midland Football Combination from 1991 to 1993.

They won promotion to the Leicestershire League Division 1 in 1960 and to the Premier Division in 1983.

They also competed in the FA Cup and FA Vase, reaching the 2nd qualifying round of the former in 1985 and 1987.

References

Defunct football clubs in England
Defunct football clubs in Leicestershire
Midland Football Combination
Leicestershire Senior League